Bushwhacked! is an Australian children's adventure television series which first aired on ABC3 on 6 October 2012. Bushwacked! follows hosts on weird and sometimes deadly wildlife missions around Australia.

Hosts
 Kayne Tremills 2012–
 Kamil Ellis 2014–
 Brandon Walters 2012

References

External links
 

Australian Broadcasting Corporation original programming
Australian children's television series
2012 Australian television series debuts
2017 Australian television series endings
Television shows set in Australia